Sultanat is a 1986 Bollywood film written and directed by Mukul S. Anand. The film stars Dharmendra, Sunny Deol, Sridevi, Juhi Chawla, Karan Kapoor, Amrish Puri, Tom Alter and Shakti Kapoor. It was the debut movie of both Juhi Chawla (Miss India 1984) and Karan Kapoor (son of Shashi Kapoor). It was the first film in which Dharmendra appeared onscreen with his son Sunny Deol. Earlier they had both appeared in the 1984 film Sunny but did not share any scenes together.

Plot
Shah (Tom Alter) is the King of a Sultanate in Middle-Eastern Asia. When a bandit tribe leader, Razoulli Al-Jabber Al-Nasser (Amrish Puri) and his troops attack their region, the army led by brave Lieutenant Khalid (Dharmendra) fights back and defeats the enemy troops. Razoulli manages to escape and in the process abducts Khalid's pregnant wife, who gives birth to a baby boy but herself dies during childbirth. A midwife professes that the baby boy is a blessed one and is destined to become the Sultan (King) of the Sultanat (Sultanate) in future. Hearing this, Razoulli decides to keep the boy for himself, as Razoulli's wife was unable to give him a male child to continue his lineage. He then tells Khalid that both his wife and child died during childbirth. Razoulli names him Sultan (Sunny Deol) and raises him. He teaches Sultan all the war skills. Meanwhile, Khalid remarries and has a second son Samir (Karan Kapoor) who is sent abroad to be raised and educated in a secure environment. Khalid, who is the general now, then takes an oath to kill Razoulli. Sultan grows up to become a powerful warrior and a capable leader of his people.

Princess Yasmeen (Sridevi) is the beautiful daughter of the King Shah. Sultan is smitten by princess Yasmeen and dares to look into her eyes during her cavalcade. She asks him to bow before her or face punishment, instead he kisses her. As its consequence, Sultan is captured and tortured by Yasmeen's troops at her behest. He is then made to enter a death race. He escapes from it and abducts Yasmeen. Eventually after some skirmishes between them, they both fall madly in love with each other.

Razoulli is later killed by General Khalid and his wife loses her senses. Sultan swears to avenge his father's death, and finds out that the person responsible is General Khalid. Sultan learns that Khalid's son, Samir and his fiancée, Zarina (Juhi Chawla), are to arrive. He plans to abduct them. Khalid discovers Sultan's intention and decides to kill him. When Samir and Zarina arrive, Sultan overpowers them, but they manage to escape as Khalid comes to rescue them. Meanwhile, Khalid is captured by Sultan's men. Khalid and Sultan decide to duel till death. What Khalid does not know is that Sultan is none other than his son, who was abducted at a young age and left with Razoulli. But now it seems that the duel between father and son will only end when one is killed by the other.

Cast
 Dharmendra as General Khalid
 Sunny Deol as Sultan
 Sridevi as Princess Yasmeen
 Juhi Chawla as Zarina
 Karan Kapoor as Samir
 Amrish Puri as Razoulli Al Jabbar
 Tom Alter as Shah
 Shakti Kapoor as Shakir
 Dalip Tahil as Janna
 Tej Sapru as Zafar 
 Jugal Hansraj as Child

Soundtrack

References

External links
 

1986 films
1980s Hindi-language films
1980s Urdu-language films
Indian action films
Films directed by Mukul S. Anand
Films scored by Kalyanji Anandji
Films scored by Anand Raj Anand
1986 action films
Hindi-language action films
Urdu-language Indian films